Rask is a surname which may refer to:

Politics
Maija Rask (born 1951), Finnish politician
Märt Rask (born 1950), Estonian attorney, jurist, and politician
Ola Rask (born 1940), Swedish politician
Samuel A. Rask (1874-1959), American businessman and politician

Sport

Association football
Caroline Rask (born 1994), Danish footballer
Jesper Rask (born 1988), Danish footballer
Mikkel Rask (born 1983), Danish footballer
Svend Aage Rask (born 1935), Danish footballer

Ice hockey
Fanny Rask (born 1991), Swedish ice hockey player
Joonas Rask (born 1990), Finnish ice hockey player
Tuukka Rask (born 1987), Finnish ice hockey player
Victor Rask (born 1993), Swedish ice hockey player

Other sports
Bengt Rask (born 1958), Swedish swimmer
Erik Rask (born 1936), Danish rower
Joakim Rask (born 1972), Swedish golfer
Kaarto Rask (1928–2001), Finnish shot putter

Other
Gertrud Rask (1673–1735), Norwegian missionary to Greenland
Grethe Rask (1930–1977), Danish physician and surgeon who became one of the first non-Africans to die due to AIDS
Helene Rask (born 1980), Norwegian model
Karin Rask (born 1979), Estonian actress
Rasmus Rask (1787–1832), Danish scholar and philologist

Danish-language surnames
Estonian-language surnames
Norwegian-language surnames
Swedish-language surnames